Teddy Nambooze is a Ugandan accountant and a legislator.  She serves as the elected Woman Member of Parliament for Mpigi district in Uganda's 11th parliament. Politically she is affiliated to National Unity Platform (NUP) under whose ticket she contested and won in the 2021 general elections.

Background and education 
Nambooze was born in Ggoli a village in Kammengo  sub-county along Kampala-Masaka road in Mpigi district. She attended St. Bruno Secondary School Ggoli in Kammengo sub-county for her high school education. Nambooze studied a Bachelors Degree in Business Administration at Nkumba University, Entebbe, in Uganda in 2002.

Work experience 
Nambooze worked as a data entry at the Ministry of Education before joining the Hunger project in Kalamba sub-county in Butamabala district, the project was intended to teach women in the area financial skills to alleviate poverty. The project set up a SACCO and due to her hard work, Nambooze was appointed the SACCO manager.

In 2011, Nambooze started up a bank in the names Trust Development Initiative (TRUDI) where she  currently serves as the director. In 2016, she contested on the Mpigi district woman MP seat but unfortunately results were not in her favor. In 2021, Nambooze came back to contest on the same position and this time round she emerged the winner. She is currently a legislator in the Parliament of Uganda serving as the Woman member of Parliament elect for Mpigi district.

References 

 Survey: NUP’s Teddy Nambooze leading with 51% in Mpigi Woman MP race
 Ministers Kamuntu, Nabakooba, Kasolo, Tumwesigye trail opponents

Ugandan accountants
Members of the Parliament of Uganda
Nkumba University alumni
People from Mpigi District
Year of birth missing (living people)
Living people
21st-century Ugandan politicians
21st-century Ugandan women politicians